HMS Delight was a  destroyer of the British Royal Navy, launched in 1950 as the Royal Navy's first all-welded warship, and broken up at Inverkeithing in 1971.

Service history
In 1956 she formed part of the Royal Navy's force used during the Suez Operation. In 1959 Delight was involved in a collision in the Mediterranean with the cruiser . Two ratings died during damage control activities.

Notes

Publications

External links
Life in a Blue Suit - HMS Delight (MSN Group)

 

Daring-class destroyers (1949) of the Royal Navy
Ships built in Govan
1950 ships
Cold War destroyers of the United Kingdom